Jo Spence (15 June 1934, London –  24 June 1992, Camden) was a British photographer, a writer, cultural worker, and a photo therapist. She began her career in the field of commercial photography but soon started her own agency which specialised in family portraits, and wedding photos. In the 1970s, she refocused her work towards documentary photography, adopting a politicized approach to her art form, with socialist and feminist themes revisited throughout her career. Self-portraits about her own fight with breast cancer, depicting various stages of her breast cancer to subvert the notion of an idealized female form, inspired projects in 'photo therapy', a means of using the medium to work on psychological health.

Early life 
Jo Spence was born on 15 June 1934 in London to working-class parents.

Career
She started off as a wedding photographer and ran a studio from 1967–1974. Soon afterwards, she began documentary work in the early 1970s, motivated by her political concerns. Both a socialist and feminist, she worked to represent these issues through her practice of photography, first as a founding member of the Hackney Flashers (1974), a collective of broadly feminist and socialist women who produced exhibitions such as 'Women and Work' and 'Who's Holding the Baby'. She was subsequently active in establishing the Photography Workshop (1974), a group focused on education and publishing, including its Camerawork magazine (1976–1985), along with the socialist historian of photography Terry Dennett (1938-2018), with whom she continued to collaborate for the rest of her life. 
 
In 1979, Spence studied the theory and practice of photography at the Polytechnic of Central London with photo theorist Victor Burgin. She gained a first class Honours Degree and moved on from her previous notions of photography, taking greater account of visual semiotics manifested in the medium. With fellow students Mary Ann Kennedy, Jane Munro and Charlotte Pembrey, Spence co-founded The Polysnappers. During the late 1970s and into the early 1980s her work became more focused on themes of domesticity and family life. In a companion piece for Beyond the Family Album, Public Images, Private Conventions she wrote on how she wished to  "question [...] who represents who in society, how they do it and for what purpose."

In 1982, she was diagnosed with breast cancer. After her diagnosis, Spence started to focus on identity, subjectivity, mental and physical health. She rejected conventional therapy and explored holistic therapy and the personal and feminist political dimension of living with cancer. It was through experiencing the effectiveness of using photography in confronting and documenting her hospitalisation and illness that Spence, with Rosy Martin, developed 'photo therapy' in which the subject was empowered to control their image to discover and represent unexpressed or repressed feelings and ideas. By working collaboratively the person in front of the camera was both subject and author of the image. Other collaborators/ therapists included Ya’acov Kahn, David Roberts and Dr Tim Sheard.

Alongside her photography, Spence maintained a career as an educator, writer, and broadcaster and undertook a three-month tour with her work to Australia, Canada, and the United States before discovering that she had leukemia from which she later died in London in June 1992, shortly after a civil marriage in May formalising her partnership with David Roberts. Terry Dennett, who was a former collaborator and friend of Spence, was the curator of the Jo Spence Memorial Archive.

Works 
 1973–75: Children’s Rights Workshop; documentary
 1979: Beyond The Family Album
 1980: Fairy Tales and Photography, BA thesis, republished 2020
 1980–82: Remodelling Photo History
 1980–82: The Polysnappers
 1982–86: The Picture of Health?
 1982: Cancer Shock, Photonovel

1984–onwards: Photo therapy projects 
 1988–89: Narratives of Dis-ease: Ritualised Procedures, produced with psychotherapist, Dr Tim Sheard
 1989: Libido Uprising, photo therapy works produced with Rosy Martin and Spence’s partner David Roberts
 1990: Cultural Sniperproduced by Spence and David Roberts
 1990: Jo Spence in collaboration with Terry Dennett: Collaborative works; Australian tour of Melbourne, Victorian Centre for Photography at the George Paton Gallery, University of Melbourne Sept. 27-Oct. 11; Sydney, Tin Sheds Gallery, University of Sydney, Oct. 17-Nov. 11; Adelaide, Experimental Art Foundation Nov. 22-Dec. 16.
 1991–92: The Crisis Project: Scenes of the Crime. Unfinished collaboration with Terry Dennett
 1991–2: The Final Project
 1991–92: Metamorphosis
 1992: Hospice Diaries

Bibliography 

 Jo Spence: The Final Project. Louisa Lee, editor. Ridinghouse. 2013. 
 
 Jo Spence: Putting Myself in the Picture: a Political, Personal and Photographic Autobiography. Frances Borzello, editor. Camden Press. 1986. 
 Jo Stanley (Ed.), Jo Spence: Cultural Sniping: The Art of Transgression, (London: Routledge, 1995) 
 Graham Clarke, The Photograph.  Oxford University Press. pp. 139–140 (from the series The Oxford History of Art), 1997 , 
 Robert Hirsch, Seizing the Light, McGraw Hill. 1999. 
 Charles Hagen, Photography View: Turning the Lens Inward. The New York Times, Sept.22, 1991, (Arts)
 Gill Saunders, 'Nature Versus Culture,' in The Nude: A New Perspective, pp. 91–115. . Cambridge: Harper & Row, 1989 
 Susan Bell, Photo images: Jo Spence’s narratives of living with illness, Health Journal Vol 6/No 1, p5–30, (London: Sage, 2002)
 Terry Dennett, 'The wounded photographer: The genesis of Jo Spence’s ‘camera therapy’', Afterimage Vol 29/No 3, p26–27, (Rochester, NY: Visual Studies Workshop, 2001).
 Terry Dennett, 'Jo Spence’s camera therapy: personal therapeutic photography as a response to adversity', European Journal of Psychotherapy & Counselling, Vol 11/ No 1, p7–19, (London: Routledge, 2009)
 Terry Dennett, 'Jo Spence’s Auto-therapeutic survival strategies,' Health Journal Vol 15/No 3, p223–29, (London: Sage, 2011)
 Terry Dennett, David Evans, Sylvia Gohl and Jo Spence, Photography/Politics: One, (London: Photography Workshop, 1979)
 H. Hagiwara (Ed.), Jo Spence autobiographical photography, (Osaka: Shinsuisha Press, 2005)
 Patricia Holland, Jo Spence and Simon Watney, Photography/ Politics: Two, (London: Photography Workshop/Comedia, 1986)
 Jorge Ribalta, 'The continuing pertinence of Jo Spence,' Camera Austria, Vol 94/ No 36, (Graz: Camera Austria, 2006)
 Jo Spence. Beyond the Perfect Image. Photography, Subjectivity, Antagonism, MACBA Exhibition catalogue, (Barcelona: MACBA, 2005)
 Jo Spence and Joan Soloman (Ed.), What Can a Woman Do with a Camera?: Photography for Women, (London: Scarlet Press, 1995)

See also 

 The Hackney Flashers

References

External links 
 Blog/News
 Jo Spence's Estate
 Jo Spence collection at the Ryerson Image Centre
 Hackney Flashers Collective

1934 births
1992 deaths
20th-century English women artists
20th-century women photographers
British feminists
Deaths from breast cancer
English women photographers
Historians of photography
Photographers from London
Socialist feminists